Nascent-polypeptide-associated complex alpha polypeptide, also known as NACA, is a protein which in humans is encoded by the NACA gene.

Function 

NACA prevents short recently synthesized (i.e., nascent) ribosome-associated polypeptides from inappropriate interactions with cytosolic proteins. NACA binds nascent-polypeptide domains emerging from ribosomes unless it contains a signal peptide which is fully exposed. Depletion of NACA from ribosomes carrying nascent polypeptides allows the signal recognition particle (SRP) to crosslink to polypeptides regardless of whether or not they contain signal peptides or not. In the absence of NACA, proteins lacking signal peptides can be mis-translocated into the endoplasmic reticulum.

The NACA protein is expressed in bone during development and acts as a transcriptional coactivator in conjunction with acidic activators.

Interactions
NACA has been shown to interact with BTF3, FADD, C-jun, and 3 members of taxilin family.

References

Further reading

Human proteins